The geography of Gozo, is dominated by water as it is the second largest island in the Maltese archipelago and is made up out of limestone. There are several islands which fall under Gozitan jurisdiction and thus are additions to the overarching Maltese archipelago. It is mostly known for its multitude of low-lying hills. The highest point in Gozo is Ta' Dbiegi hill, which falls under the San Lawrenz local council. The island of Comino, which is also the third largest island in Malta, falls under Gozo.

Extreme Points of Gozo 

Lantern Point and Sultan Rock are both found on Comino.

San Dimitri Point and Reqqa Point are the westernmost and northernmost points of the entirety of the Maltese islands.

Index of hills in Gozo

References 

Geography
Gozo
